The squirrel galagos are a group of four species of strepsirrhine primates. They are classified in the genus Sciurocheirus of the family Galagidae.

Originally a single species was described, Galago alleni, by Waterhouse (1838), and the species was placed in a separate genus, Sciurocheirus by Gray in 1863. While some listings still included them in Galago, the species was split into three taxa, alleni, cameronensis, and gabonensis by Eisentraut (1973) and Groves (1989) which were then later elevated to species status by Groves (2001) as S. alleni, S. cameronensis, and S. gabonensis and followed by Groves (2005) and Nekaris (2013). In 2017, a fourth species, S. makandensis was described.

 Genus Sciurocheirus
 Bioko Allen's bushbaby, S. alleni
 Cross River bushbaby, S. cameronensis
 Gabon bushbaby, S.  gabonensis
 Makandé squirrel galago, S.  makandensis

References

Galagos
Taxa named by John Edward Gray
Taxa described in 1872